New Albany National Cemetery is a United States National Cemetery located in the city of New Albany, in Floyd County, Indiana. Administered by the United States Department of Veterans Affairs, it encompasses , and as of the end of 2005, had 6,881 interments. It is managed by Zachary Taylor National Cemetery.

History 
New Albany National Cemetery was established in 1862, purchased from local land owner, Dr. Charles Bowman, to inter soldiers who died while serving at the training ground of Camp Noble. Many of the initial interments were also transferred from nearby military hospital cemeteries. The cemetery contains almost three hundred Union soldiers, and two unknown Confederate soldiers.

New Albany National Cemetery was placed on the National Register of Historic Places in 1999.

Gallery

References

External links

 National Cemetery Administration
 New Albany National Cemetery
 
 
 Historic American Landscapes Survey (HALS) documentation:
 
 
 

Cemeteries on the National Register of Historic Places in Indiana
Historic American Landscapes Survey in Indiana
Buildings and structures in New Albany, Indiana
National Register of Historic Places in Floyd County, Indiana
United States national cemeteries
Protected areas of Floyd County, Indiana